This page presents the results of the men's volleyball tournament at the 1998 Asian Games, which was held from Monday December 7 to Tuesday December 15, 1998 in Bangkok, Thailand. The men's volleyball event was contested for the eleventh time at the Asian Games.

Results

Preliminary round

Pool A

|}

Pool B

|}

Classification 9th–10th

|}

Classification 5th–8th

Semifinals

|}

Classification 7th–8th

|}

Classification 5th–6th

|}

Final round

Semifinals

|}

Bronze medal match

|}

Final

|}

Final standing

References
 Men's Results
 Results

Men's volleyball